The Atlas G, also known as Atlas G Centaur-D1AR was an American expendable launch system derived from the Atlas-Centaur. It was a member of the Atlas family of rockets, and was used to launch seven communication satellites during the mid to late 1980s. Atlas G consisted of an improved Atlas core with modernized avionics and stretched propellant tanks. The Centaur stage also had several updated components and other technical improvements. It was replaced by the Atlas I, which had an improved guidance system.

The maiden voyage of Atlas G was the launch of Intelsat 5 on June 9, 1984. Atlas performance was normal as was Centaur orbital injection, but during the coasting phase prior to the second Centaur burn, the stage's LOX tank split open. The Centaur and Intelsat tumbled end-over-end and were left in a useless orbit where they remained until reentering the atmosphere four months later.

Investigation into the failure found that a minor fatigue crack developed in the Centaur LOX tank during staging and orbital injection, which eventually led to complete tank failure and loss of the mission. The uprated Centaur flown on Atlas G, among other changes, deleted the propellant boost pumps in the interest of greater simplicity and weight-saving. To compensate for this, LOX tank pressure was increased 25%. Although the tank had been designed to accommodate higher pressure, technicians at Convair inexplicably failed to test Centaur 5402 for leaks before shipping it to Cape Canaveral. In addition, engineers had not tested the Centaur G stages to verify if they could handle the shock from the explosive bolts on the booster firing during staging, but this test was performed later and the stage passed it.

Finally, the leak testing program and tools used at Convair were outdated and less reliable than newer methods and the tech personnel in charge of fabricating the Centaur's balloon tanks were badly inexperienced. Ultimately, this was a symptom of the entire US space program in the 1980s as plans to entirely replace expendable launch vehicles with the Space Shuttle had resulted in large-scale budget cutbacks and layoffs of experienced technicians.

The first stage was derived from the SM-65 Atlas missile, and a Centaur was used as the second stage. The first stage was also flown without the Centaur, as the Atlas H.

References

Rockets and missiles
Atlas (rocket family)